Andrew Downes may refer to:

 Andrew Downes (composer) (1950–2023), British classical composer
 Andrew Downes (scholar) ( 1549–1628), also known as Dounaeus, English classical scholar